Eloise (originally titled Eloise: A Book for Precocious Grown-ups) is the first of the Eloise book series written and drawn by Kay Thompson and Hilary Knight, respectively. It was published in 1955. In 1969, the adult-oriented book was re-released as a children's book, without change. An audiobook version of Eloise, narrated by Bernadette Peters, was released in October 2015 to coincide with the 60th anniversary of the series.

Adaptations
In 1956, the book was adapted into a 90-minute television play, Eloise, broadcast on the CBS television show Playhouse 90.

On April 23, 2003, Eloise was adapted into a live-action made-for-TV film, titled Eloise at the Plaza, produced by DiNovi Pictures and Handmade Films for Walt Disney Television with distribution handled by ABC Television Network. It was released on both VHS and DVD in the same year by Buena Vista Home Entertainment. After the release of the first movie, Eloise at Christmastime was released on November 22, 2003 on VHS and DVD in the same year.

References

External links
 Eloise Book Review

1955 children's books
Eloise (books)
Works set in hotels
New York City in fiction